At the 1904 Summer Olympics, nine swimming events were contested.  The 1904 swimming competition was the only time in Olympic history that racing distances were measured in yards.  The competition was held September 4–6, 1904.  There was a total of 32 participants from 5 countries competing.

The 100 returned after not being contested in 1900. The 1000 metres and 4000 metres were replaced with the much shorter  and  events, making the 200 the only freestyle event to be held for the second time in a row.

The obstacle course and underwater swimming events were eliminated, while breaststroke made its Olympic debut.

Medal table

Medal summary

Participating nations
32 swimmers from 5 nations competed.

References 

 
 
 
 

 
1904 Summer Olympics events
1904
1904 in swimming